Tehmas Khan Football Stadium (sometimes called Tamas Khan Football Ground) is a historic football ground located at Faqeerabad, Peshawar, the capital of Khyber Pakhtunkhwa, Pakistan.

Overview 
The stadium is located near the historic Shahi Bagh Peshawar, adjacent to Arbab Niaz Cricket Stadium and Peshawar Gymkhana Ground. It is popular among footballers and football tournaments are regularly played here. The stadium seats 6,000.

The 28th edition of National Football Challenge Cup was held here from 19 July to 4 August 2019.

See also 

 Shahi Bagh Peshawar
 Arbab Naiz Cricket Stadium Peshawar

References 

Stadiums in Pakistan
Sport in Khyber Pakhtunkhwa
Sport in Peshawar